North Lakes is a census-designated place (CDP) in Matanuska-Susitna Borough, Alaska, United States. It was first listed as a CDP prior to the 2020 census, after the split of the former CDP of Lakes. It is part of the Anchorage, Alaska Metropolitan Statistical Area.

Geography
North Lakes is located northeast of Wasilla and west of Palmer; the CDP name refers to a chain of lakes in the community. It is bordered to the south by the South Lakes CDP.

Demographics
As of the 2020 census, the population was 9,450, the second most populated CDP in the borough and the fourth largest in the state.

References

Anchorage metropolitan area
Census-designated places in Alaska
Census-designated places in Matanuska-Susitna Borough, Alaska